The 2016–17 UEFA Champions League was the 62nd season of Europe's premier club football tournament organised by UEFA, and the 25th season since it was renamed from the European Champion Clubs' Cup to the UEFA Champions League.

The final was played between Juventus and Real Madrid at the Millennium Stadium in Cardiff, Wales. It was the second time that the two teams faced each other in the competition's decisive match, having previously met in the 1998 final. Real Madrid, the defending champions, beat Juventus 4–1 to win a record-extending 12th title. With this victory, Real Madrid became the first team to successfully defend their title in the Champions League era, and the first to successfully defend a European Cup since Milan in 1990.

As winners, Real Madrid qualified as the UEFA representative for the 2017 FIFA Club World Cup in the United Arab Emirates, and also earned the right to play against the winners of the 2016–17 UEFA Europa League, Manchester United, in the 2017 UEFA Super Cup, ultimately triumphing in both competitions.

Association team allocation
A total of 78 teams from 53 of the 55 UEFA member associations were expected to participate in the 2016–17 UEFA Champions League (the exceptions being Liechtenstein, which did not organise a domestic league, and Kosovo, whose participation was not accepted in their first attempt as UEFA members). The association ranking based on the UEFA country coefficients was used to determine the number of participating teams for each association:
Associations 1–3 each had four teams qualify.
Associations 4–6 each had three teams qualify.
Associations 7–15 each had two teams qualify.
Associations 16–54 (except Liechtenstein) each had one team qualify.
The winners of the 2015–16 UEFA Champions League and 2015–16 UEFA Europa League were each given an additional entry if they did not qualify for the 2016–17 UEFA Champions League through their domestic league. Because a maximum of five teams from one association can enter the Champions League, if both the Champions League title holders and the Europa League title holders were from the same top three ranked association and finish outside the top four of their domestic league, the fourth-placed team of their association would be moved to the Europa League. For this season:
The winners of the 2015–16 UEFA Champions League, Real Madrid, qualified through their domestic league, meaning the additional entry for the Champions League title holders was not necessary.
The winners of the 2015–16 UEFA Europa League, Sevilla, did not qualify through their domestic league, meaning the additional entry for the Europa League title holders was necessary.

Association ranking
For the 2016–17 UEFA Champions League, the associations were allocated places according to their 2015 UEFA country coefficients, which took into account their performance in European competitions from 2010–11 to 2014–15.

Apart from the allocation based on the country coefficients, associations could have additional teams participating in the Champions League, as noted below:
 – Additional berth for Europa League title holders

Notes

Distribution
In the default access list, the Champions League title holders enter the group stage. However, since Real Madrid already qualified for the group stage (as the runners-up of the 2015–16 La Liga), the Champions League title holders berth in the group stage is given to the Europa League title holders, Sevilla.

Teams
League positions of the previous season qualified via league position shown in parentheses. Sevilla qualified as Europa League title holders. (TH: Champions League title holders; EL: Europa League title holders).

Notes

Round and draw dates
The schedule of the competition was as follows (all draws were held at the UEFA headquarters in Nyon, Switzerland, unless stated otherwise).

Qualifying rounds

In the qualifying rounds and the play-off round, teams were divided into seeded and unseeded teams based on their 2016 UEFA club coefficients, and then drawn into two-legged home-and-away ties. Teams from the same association could not be drawn against each other.

First qualifying round
The draws for the first and second qualifying rounds were held on 20 June 2016. The first legs were played on 28 June, and the second legs were played on 5 and 6 July 2016.

Second qualifying round
The first legs were played on 12 and 13 July, and the second legs were played on 19 and 20 July 2016.

Third qualifying round
The third qualifying round was split into two separate sections: Champions Route (for league champions) and League Route (for league non-champions). The losing teams in both sections entered the 2016–17 UEFA Europa League play-off round.

The draw for the third qualifying round was held on 15 July 2016. The first legs were played on 26 and 27 July, and the second legs were played on 2 and 3 August 2016.

Play-off round

The play-off round was split into two separate sections: Champions Route (for league champions) and League Route (for league non-champions). The losing teams in both sections entered the 2016–17 UEFA Europa League group stage.

The draw for the play-off round was held on 5 August 2016. The first legs were played on 16 and 17 August, and the second legs were played on 23 and 24 August 2016.

Group stage

The draw for the group stage was held on 25 August 2016, at the Grimaldi Forum in Monaco. The 32 teams were drawn into eight groups of four, with the restriction that teams from the same association could not be drawn against each other. For the draw, the teams were seeded into four pots based on the following principles (introduced starting 2015–16 season):
Pot 1 contained the title holders and the champions of the top seven associations based on their 2015 UEFA country coefficients.
Pot 2, 3 and 4 contained the remaining teams, seeded based on their 2016 UEFA club coefficients.

In each group, teams play against each other home-and-away in a round-robin format. The group winners and runners-up advance to the round of 16, while the third-placed teams enter the 2016–17 UEFA Europa League round of 32. The matchdays are 13–14 September, 27–28 September, 18–19 October, 1–2 November, 22–23 November, and 6–7 December 2016.

The youth teams of the clubs that qualify for the group stage also play in the 2016–17 UEFA Youth League on the same matchdays, where they compete in the UEFA Champions League Path (the youth domestic champions of the top 32 associations compete in a separate Domestic Champions Path until the play-offs).

A total of 17 national associations are represented in the group stage. Leicester City and Rostov made their debut appearances in the group stage. For the first time since the 2002–03 edition, England's Chelsea did not qualify for the group stage.

Group A

Group B

Group C

Group D

Group E

Group F

Group G

Group H

Knockout phase

In the knockout phase, teams play against each other over two legs on a home-and-away basis, except for the one-match final. The mechanism of the draws for each round is as follows:
In the draw for the round of 16, the eight group winners are seeded, and the eight group runners-up are unseeded. The seeded teams are drawn against the unseeded teams, with the seeded teams hosting the second leg. Teams from the same group or the same association cannot be drawn against each other.
In the draws for the quarter-finals onwards, there are no seedings, and teams from the same group or the same association can be drawn against each other.

Bracket

Round of 16
The draw for the round of 16 was held on 12 December 2016. The first legs were played on 14, 15, 21 and 22 February, and the second legs were played on 7, 8, 14 and 15 March 2017.

Quarter-finals
The draw for the quarter-finals was held on 17 March 2017. The first legs were played on 11 and 12 April, and the second legs were played on 18 and 19 April 2017.

Semi-finals
The draw for the semi-finals was held on 21 April 2017. The first legs were played on 2 and 3 May, and the second legs were played on 9 and 10 May 2017.

Final

The final was played on 3 June 2017 at the Millennium Stadium in Cardiff, Wales. The "home" team (for administrative purposes) was determined by an additional draw held after the semi-final draw.

Statistics
Statistics exclude qualifying rounds and play-off round.

Top goalscorers

Top assists

Squad of the season
The UEFA technical study group selected the following 18 players as the squad of the tournament.

Players of the season

New UEFA Champions League Goalkeeper of the Season, Defender of the Season, Midfielder of the Season, and Forward of the Season positional awards were introduced for the 2016–17 season. Votes were cast by coaches of the 32 teams in the group stage, together with 55 journalists selected by the European Sports Media (ESM) group, representing each of UEFA's member associations. The coaches were not allowed to vote for players from their own teams. Jury members selected their top three players, with the first receiving five points, the second three and the third one. The shortlist of the top three players were announced on 4 August 2017. The award winners were announced and presented during the 2017–18 UEFA Champions League group stage draw in Monaco on 24 August 2017.

Goalkeeper of the season

Defender of the season

Midfielder of the season

Forward of the season

See also

2016–17 UEFA Europa League
2017 UEFA Super Cup
2017 FIFA Club World Cup
2016–17 UEFA Women's Champions League
2016–17 UEFA Youth League

References

External links

2016–17 UEFA Champions League

 
1
2016-17